Tapauá is a municipality located in the Brazilian state of Amazonas. Its population was 17,015 (2020) and its area is 89,324 km², making it the third largest municipality in Amazonas and the fifth largest in Brazil, comparable to  South Carolina or Jordan.

Conservation

The municipality contains the  Abufari Biological Reserve, a strictly protected area.
It contains 30.35% of the  Piagaçu-Purus Sustainable Development Reserve, established in 2003.
The municipality contains about 9% of the Balata-Tufari National Forest, a  sustainable use conservation unit created in 2005.
The municipality also contains about 94% of the Nascentes do Lago Jari National Park, an  protected area established in 2008.
It contains 0.33% of the  Médio Purus Extractive Reserve, created in 2008.
It contains 98% of the  Tapauá State Forest, created in 2009.

References

Municipalities in Amazonas (Brazilian state)